Robert Frankel may refer to:

 Robert J. Frankel (1941–2009), American thoroughbred race horse trainer
 Robert Frankel (boxer) (born 1980), American boxer